Antygomonas incomitata is a species of kinorhycha. This particular species was found in the Bay of Vestar.

References

External links

Kinorhyncha
Animals described in 1990